Aruop is a Torricelli language of Papua New Guinea. Speakers of the language call the language Srenge or Lawu Srenge, where lawu is the Srenge word for 'language'.  Speakers of surrounding languages call the language Aruop, which is the Srenge word for no, following a common convention in the region of using the word for 'no' in a language as a name for that language.  Documentation of Srenge is currently underway by Matthew S. Dryer and Lea Brown of the University at Buffalo.

References

Palei languages
Languages of Sandaun Province